Louis Culot (18 July 1915 – 1978) was a Belgian wrestler. He competed in the men's freestyle welterweight at the 1948 Summer Olympics.

References

External links
 

1915 births
1978 deaths
Belgian male sport wrestlers
Olympic wrestlers of Belgium
Wrestlers at the 1948 Summer Olympics
Sportspeople from Brussels